International Workshop on 1 & 2 Dimensional Magnetic Measurement and Testing (commonly referred to as 1&2DM or even 2DM) - international meeting devoted to problems in one- and two-directional magnetisation of ferromagnetic materials.

Link to the next workshop

Scope
 Basic problems, magnetisation processes, domain structures, Barkhausen noise
 Aspects of industrial testing and standardisation
 Power loss, polarisation, magnetostriction and anisotropy measurement
 Magnetisation systems and sensors for 1 and 2D measurements
 High frequency related aspects
 B and H vector relationships and their interpretation
 Relevance to applications (e.g., electrical machines, transformers, etc.).
 Modelling of magnetic properties of materials, relevance of microstructures

From the 8th 1&2DM the technical papers written in English are published in Przegląd Elektrotechniczny (which in Polish means Electric Review) issued in Warsaw, Poland.
Przegląd Elektrotechniczny is one of the oldest European periodicals (since 1919), which is still being in print. From the 12th edition full conference papers have been published on the International Journal of Applied Electromagnetics and Mechanics-IJAEM, (IOS Press, Amsterdam, The Netherlands).

International Steering Committee
 Prof Carlo Ragusa (Chair), Italy
 Dr Johannes Sievert (past Chair), Germany
 Dr Phil Anderson, United Kingdom
 Dr Carlo Appino, Italy
 Prof Luc Dupré, Belgium.
 Prof Masato Enokizono, Japan
 Dr Fausto Fiorillo, Italy
 Dr Nicolas Galopin, France
 Dr Jeremy Hall, United Kingdom 
 Prof Yongjian Li, China
 Prof Anthony J. Moses, United Kingdom
 Prof Helmut Pfützner, Austria
 Mr Stefan Siebert, Germany
 Prof Marian Soiński, Poland
 Prof Derac Son, Korea
 Mr Kiyoshi Wajima, Japan
 Dr Xing Zhou, China
 Prof Jian Guo Zhu, Australia

1&2DM Workshops
1&2DM is usually held in September. The years are chosen as to alternate with the Soft Magnetic Materials Conference:
 17th - Lüdenscheid, Germany - 2024
 16th - Cardiff, United Kingdom - 2020*
Virtual - Cardiff MAGMA Centre, UK - 29-30 September 2021 (https://2dm2021.com)
In-Person - Cardiff, Wales, United Kingdom - 20-22 September 2022 (https://2dm2022.com/)
 15th - Grenoble, France - 2018 (https://2dm2018.sciencesconf.org)
 14th - Tianjin, China - 2016 (http://2dm2016.net/)
 13th - Torino, Italy - 2014 (https://web.archive.org/web/20171024165622/http://www.2d-m.it/)
 12th - Wien, Austria - 2012 (https://web.archive.org/web/20120722211750/http://www.2-dm.at/index.html)
 11th - Oita, Japan - 2010 (https://web.archive.org/web/20120722212528/http://www.2-dm.at/oita/index.html)
 10th - Cardiff, United Kingdom - 2008 (organised by Wolfson Centre for Magnetics) (https://web.archive.org/web/20120722212147/http://www.2-dm.at/cardiff/index.html)
 9th - Częstochowa, Poland - 2006 (https://web.archive.org/web/20120722212316/http://www.2-dm.at/PCz/www/index.html).
 8th - Ghent, Belgium - 2004
 7th - Lüdenscheid, Germany - 2002
 6th - Badgastein, Austria - 2000
 5th - Grenoble, France - 1997
 4th - Cardiff, United Kingdom - 1995
 3rd - Torino, Italy - 1993
 2nd - Ōita, Japan - 1992
 1st - Braunschweig, Germany - 1991
* The 16th Workshop in 2020 was postponed due to the Coronavirus Pandemic of 2019-2021. Rather than wait four years between workshops, the Cardiff University MAGMA Centre organised a combination of a virtual workshop in 2021 and an in person workshop in Cardiff in 2022.

References

External links
 http://www.2-dm.com

Physics conferences